Julie and the Phantoms: Music from the Netflix Original Series is the soundtrack album of the American musical comedy-drama web television series Julie and the Phantoms. Both soundtrack and series were released on September 10, 2020.  The album reached number 1 on both the US and Australian iTunes charts and peaked at number 4 on the US Billboard Soundtrack chart.

Background
Stars Madison Reyes and Charlie Gillespie wrote one track for the show, "Perfect Harmony" alongside the series' vocal producer Alana Da Fonesca.

Track listing

Charts

References

2020 soundtrack albums